EverestMax was the first expedition to successfully travel from the lowest point on land, the Dead Sea, to the highest point, Mount Everest, by unpowered means.

The 6 person cycling expedition, led by Dominic Faulkner, an ex UK SAS soldier, set out on 21 December 2005 and two members of the team achieved the summit of Everest 5 months later on 21 May 2006.

The expedition cycled 5000 miles passing through the countries of Jordan, Syria, Turkey, Iran, Pakistan, India, Nepal and Tibet, before ascending Everest on foot from the Northern side.

There were 5 members of the cycling team and 2 support staff. A total of 7 all together travelled for the overland journey.
3 members of the cycling team made it to the top of Everest - Pauline Sanderson, Dominic Faulkner and Jamie Rouen.
Pauline Sanderson summited with her husband Phil Sanderson. They were the first British couple to summit Everest.

See also
 Silk Road
 Tarka L'Herpiniere
List of Mount Everest expeditions

References

External sources
 http://www.thelongestclimb.com/
 http://www.domfaulkner.com/

2006